Boris Rajewsky (17 July 1893 – 22 November 1974) was a Russian-born German biophysicist, who was one of the most influential researchers on the impact of radiation on living organisms in the 20th century. He served as Rector of the Goethe University Frankfurt from 1949 to 1951.

Life and career

He was the son of a Ukrainian noble family and grew up in the Russian Empire. He studied physics at the St. Vladimir Imperial University of Kiev from 1912, and obtained a doctorate there in 1918. He moved to Germany in 1922 and became a German citizen in 1927. He became the assistant of Friedrich Dessauer and obtained an additional doctorate at the Goethe University in 1929. In 1934 he became Professor of Physics at the Goethe University, and in 1943 he became Pro-Rector of the university. He served as the university's Rector 1949–1951 and again as Pro-Rector 1951–1954. From 1946 he was chairman of the scientific council of the Max Planck Society, and in 1955, he became an adviser to the German Atomic Commission, a body of experts appointed by the federal government.

He was a member of the Nazi Party from 1937 to 1945. However, he later maintained that he had always been an opponent of national socialism.

He was the father of the noted cell biologist and cancer researcher Manfred F. Rajewsky (1934–2013), of the noted immunologist Klaus Rajewsky (b. 1936), and of the sociologist Xenia Julia Maria Rajewsky (1939–2011).

Honours
Honorary doctorates at the Free University of Berlin, the University of Giessen, Leibniz University Hannover, the University of Innsbruck, the University of Naples and the University of Turin
Member of the Scientific Society (Wissenschaftliche Gesellschaft) at the Goethe University Frankfurt (from 1955 to 1970 as President)
Faculty Medal of the Faculty of Natural Sciences, Goethe University Frankfurt
Gold Medal of the Sapienza University of Rome
Fellow of the Academy of Sciences Leopoldina
Goethe Plaque of the City of Frankfurt, 1951
Commander's Cross (Großes Verdienstkreuz) of the Order of Merit of the Federal Republic of Germany, 1953
Goethe Plaque of the State of Hesse, 1958
Academia Medica in Rome, 1959
Sigillum Magnum of the University of Bologna, 1962
Knight Commander's Cross (Großes Verdienstkreuz mit Stern) of the Order of Merit of the Federal Republic of Germany, 1963
Lenin Medal in Gold

Bibliography

References

Literature

H. Muth: Boris Rajewsky zum 80. Geburtstag. in: Biophysik 10, 3-5 (1973)

1893 births
1974 deaths
German biochemists
Ukrainian chemists
People from Chyhyryn
Knights Commander of the Order of Merit of the Federal Republic of Germany
Ukrainian SSR emigrants to Germany
Max Planck Institute directors